The Třemešná ve Slezsku – Osoblaha Railway is a narrow-gauge railway connecting Třemešná on the Krnov–Głuchołazy line with Osoblaha on the Czech-Polish border. It is one of the three remaining narrow gauge railway lines with regular passenger traffic in the Czech Republic and the last one operated by the state-owned railway company České dráhy.

History
In the 1870s the owners of a sugar refinery in Osoblaha were looking for a railway connection of their town. From a financial point of view, the best alternative was a connection to the railway network in neighbouring Prussia. However, the government in Vienna refused it on political and military grounds. On 14 December 1898 a line from Třemešná was opened. Since 1958 the trains are operated by diesel-electric locomotives T 47.0.

See also
Jindřichohradecké místní dráhy

References

Further reading

External links

Railway line 298 zelpage.cz

Tremesna ve Slezsku - Osoblaha
760 mm gauge railways in the Czech Republic
Bruntál District